VIPeR is a military robot developed by the Israeli company Elbit Systems and intended for use in warfare. It was unveiled in March, 2007.

Testing 

Elbit Systems of America showed the world capabilities of Elbit Systems' unique VIPeR Robot at the Ground Robotics Obstacle Course during the recent Modern Day Marine Conference held in Quantico, VA. This course will test the limits and capabilities of robots on the field of battle.  The obstacle course included areas with different surfaces - deep sand, small gravel, brush and debris, even speed bumps.  Each of the robots had to traverse each of these types of ground as well as mounting stairs and negotiating a tunnel.  The VIPeR was one of eight in this test, and was one of the most efficient throughout.

Features 
For mobility, the VIPeR uses a pair of combined wheel/track systems (called the "Galileo Wheel" system, a patented technology by Galileo Mobility Instrument of Israel) that change shape to adapt to terrain, and a "tail" which give it the balance to go up stairs, and turn itself over. It can also move around in city environments.  Undeterred by stairs, rubble, dark alleys, caves or narrow tunnels, VIPeR is a highly effective partner for dismounted soldiers, keeping them out of harm's way by detecting IEDs and booby traps and warning them of enemies and dangers ahead.

Another feature of this robot is its ability to be packed small, it is a robot that can be carried by one man, in a backpack, including all of its gear.  Elbit had made VIPeR to weigh only around 11 kg.

The intelligent, small-signature VIPeR can also be configured with weapons capability.  The system is remotely controlled via a control harness and helmet mounted display. Optional payloads include: P&T, FLIR, observation day/night zoom camera, explosives sniffer, disrupter, 9 mm mini-Uzi with scope and pointer, grenade releaser, 4-foot robotic arm, gripper, in-building mapping and more.

Current plans call for the VIPeR to be used by special forces units and regular infantry for situations that are deemed especially dangerous to human soldiers, such as exploring caves and tunnels.

The robot is remote-controlled, rather than being an autonomous robot.

External links 
 Press release
 Defence Talk 
 Test information
 Details about the Galileo Wheel (briefly shows the VIPeR)

Military equipment of Israel
Unmanned ground combat vehicles
Robots of Israel
2007 robots
Two-wheeled robots
Tracked robots
Israeli inventions